The 2002 Tampa Bay Devil Rays season was their fifth since the franchise was created. This season, they finished last in the AL East division, and managed to finish the season with a record of 55–106. Their manager was Hal McRae who entered his first full season and last season with the Devil Rays.

Offseason
November 8, 2001: Ryan Freel was signed as a free agent with the Tampa Bay Devil Rays.

Regular season

Season standings

American League Wild Card

Record vs. opponents

Opening Day starters
 Brent Abernathy
 Steve Cox
 Chris Gomez
 Ben Grieve
 Toby Hall
 Bob Smith
 Tanyon Sturtze
 Jason Tyner
 Greg Vaughn
 Randy Winn

Notable transactions
 June 4, 2002: B. J. Upton drafted by the Tampa Bay Devil Rays in the 1st round (2nd pick) of the 2002 amateur draft. Player signed September 16, 2002.
June 4, 2002: Elijah Dukes drafted by the Tampa Bay Devil Rays in the 3rd round of the 2002 amateur draft. Player signed August 21, 2002.
September 22, 2002: Released Toe Nash, the day after he was released from jail.

Roster

Citrus series
The annual interleague games between the Florida Marlins and the Tampa Bay Devil Rays were played in June and July. They are known as the Citrus Series. The Devil Rays won the series 4-2.

Player stats

Batting

Starters by position 
Note: Pos = Position; G = Games played; AB = At bats; H = Hits; Avg. = Batting average; HR = Home runs; RBI = Runs batted in

Other batters 
Note: G = Games played; AB = At bats; H = Hits; Avg. = Batting average; HR = Home runs; RBI = Runs batted in

Pitching

Starting pitchers 
Note: G = Games pitched; IP = Innings pitched; W = Wins; L = Losses; ERA = Earned run average; SO = Strikeouts

Other pitchers 
Note: G = Games pitched; IP = Innings pitched; W = Wins; L = Losses; ERA = Earned run average; SO = Strikeouts

Relief pitchers 
Note: G = Games pitched; W = Wins; L = Losses; SV = Saves; ERA = Earned run average; SO = Strikeouts

ESPN25 Worst Team of All-Time
In 2004, ESPN was celebrating 25 years of the network since its founding in 1979. The network decided to honor the first 25 years from the best to the worst and everything else in between. The Rays were ranked 16th in the actual ESPN Worst Team Result of the first 25 years conducted by ESPN and its users. The users put them higher at 13th than the original airing as the worst team by only 3 spots.

Farm system

LEAGUE CHAMPIONS: Durham

References

2002 Tampa Bay Devil Rays at Baseball Reference.com
2002 Tampa Bay Devil Rays team page at www.baseball-almanac.com

Tampa Bay Devil Rays seasons
Tampa Bay Devil Rays season
Tampa Bay Devil Rays